"Poison" is a pop song by Australian female group Bardot and was the first single released from their self-titled debut album (2000). It was written by Darryl Sims and Michael Szumowski, who also produced the track. The single attracted much attention due to its inclusion on the high-rating Popstars program.

"Poison" debuted at number one on the Australian ARIA Singles Chart, where it stayed for two consecutive weeks, and was certified double platinum. It became the sixth highest-selling single of Australia in 2000 and was nominated for "Highest Selling Single" at the 2000 ARIA Music Awards, losing to Madison Avenue's "Don't Call Me Baby". "Poison" was also a success in New Zealand, where it spent three consecutive weeks at number one and was certified platinum. It was released in the United Kingdom on 2 April 2001, debuting and peaking at number 45 the same month.

Music video
The "Poison" music video was created during the filming of Popstars and therefore, the making of the video featured on the program. The video features the five members, each in their own distinct individual sets for the majority of the song – Tiffani is set in a hotel room, Sophie is set in a fairy garden, Sally is set in an authentic room made of bamboo, Katie is set in a futuristic, bright red room and Belinda is set in a disco room, surrounded by shining disco balls. Seconds before the final chorus, Tiffani, Sophie, Katie and Belinda slide down poles into Sally's set and spend the final chorus singing together.

Director Mark Hartley, received three nominations for Best Video at the ARIA Music Awards of 2000, including one for "Poison".

Track listings
Australian CD single (8573826332)
 "Poison"
 "Empty Room"
 "Poison" (S'N'T Club remix)
 "Poison" (Treat Me Bad dub)
 "Poison" (Full Phat remix)

UK CD single (EW229CD)
 "Poison" – 3:20
 "Poison" (S'N'T Club remix) – 5:58
 "Empty Room" – 3:33
 "Poison" (enhanced video)

Credits and personnel
Credits are adapted from the Australian CD single liner notes.

Studio
 Recorded and mixed at Tiger Recording (Sydney, Australia)

Personnel

 Bardot – vocals
 Sam Dixon – bass
 Bruce Reid – guitars
 Darryl Sims – writing
 Michael Szumowski – writing, production, programming
 Tommy Faragher – additional vocal production, mixing

 David Hemming – mixing, engineering
 Danielle McWilliam – engineering assistant
 Don Bartley – mastering
 Michael Napthali – management
 Stephen Oxenbury – photography
 Kevin Wilkins – art direction

Charts

Weekly charts

Year-end charts

Certifications

See also
 List of number-one singles of 2000 (Australia)
 List of number-one singles from the 2000s (New Zealand)

References

2000 debut singles
2000 songs
Bardot (Australian band) songs
East West Records singles
Number-one singles in Australia
Number-one singles in New Zealand
Warner Music Group singles